James Daniel Gallagher  CB FRSE is a Scottish civil servant. He was Director General of devolution for the United Kingdom's Ministry of Justice from 2007 until 2010, and served as Secretary to the Commission on Scottish Devolution. He joined Better Together in January 2014 as a strategy advisor.

He was appointed a Companion of the Order of the Bath (CB) in the 2005 Birthday Honours.

References

Scottish scholars and academics
Alumni of the University of Edinburgh
Alumni of the University of Glasgow
Civil servants in the Home Office
Civil servants in the Scottish Office
Civil servants in the Cabinet Office
Civil servants in the Scottish Government
Private secretaries in the British Civil Service
Living people
Year of birth missing (living people)
21st-century Scottish businesspeople
Fellows of the Royal Society of Edinburgh
Companions of the Order of the Bath